Dmitri Leonidovich Skoblyakov (born January 28, 1980) is a retired Russian professional footballer.

Skoblyakov played in the Russian Premier League with FC Torpedo Moscow, FC Shinnik Yaroslavl and FC Tom Tomsk.

His brother Sergei Skoblyakov is also a professional footballer.

External links
Profile at Footballfacts.ru

1980 births
Living people
Russian footballers
Russian Premier League players
Russian expatriate footballers
Expatriate footballers in Latvia
FC Shinnik Yaroslavl players
FC Lokomotiv Nizhny Novgorod players
FC Torpedo Moscow players
FC Torpedo-2 players
FC Tom Tomsk players
FC Sibir Novosibirsk players
Russian expatriate sportspeople in Latvia
Association football midfielders
FC Spartak Nizhny Novgorod players